Ein Fall für Stein is a German television series.

See also
List of German television series

External links
 

1976 German television series debuts
1976 German television series endings
German-language television shows
ZDF original programming